Hussain Nawaz Sharif (born 15 December 1971) is a Pakistani businessman who is the son of the former Prime Minister of Pakistan Nawaz Sharif. 
 
He was named in Panama Papers and is currently under investigation in Panama Papers case.
 
On 10 July 2017, JIT submitted the report revealing that Hussain Nawaz had failed to provide any documentation on Al-Azizia Steel Mill.
 
He resides at the Sharif Villa in Jeddah, Saudi Arabia, where his father lived during his time in exile.

Early life 
He was born on 15 December 1971 in Lahore to Nawaz Sharif and Kulsoom Nawaz.

Hussain Nawaz Sharif has never been a political figure nor a public office holder. He left Pakistan in 1992 for Higher education. He graduated in Law from LSE and was also called to the bar from Lincoln’s Inn. He returned to Pakistan in 1996 and joined his family business. However, his grandfather transferred him to Sharif Trust, the former’s dream project. Hussain not only built the Sharif Educational Complex but also the Sharif Medical City. There are several institutes working under the umbrella of the Sharif Trust. He also started the Sharif Trust Educational Programme (STEP) for LLB degree under the   University of London external Programme teaching. Many famous people, including anchor Muneeb Farooq and the controversial PM’s Advisor on Accountability Mirza Shehzad Akbar, got their LLB degrees through the Programme. Sharif Trust which was designated as an examination center by the University had to close STEP after the Sharif Family including Hussain Nawaz Sharif were illegally exiled from Pakistan in December 2000.

References

 

1971 births
Living people
Pakistani businesspeople
Sharif family
People named in the Panama Papers
Children of prime ministers of Pakistan
Businesspeople from Lahore
Pakistani expatriates in Saudi Arabia
Pakistani people of Kashmiri descent
Naturalised citizens of the United Kingdom
Pakistani emigrants to the United Kingdom